is a city located in Nara Prefecture, Japan. The city was founded on October 15, 1957. As of September 30, 2014, the city has an estimated population of 33,283, with 13,742 households. It has a population density of 121.17 persons per km². The total area is 291.98 km².

On September 25, 2005, the villages of Nishiyoshino and Ōtō (both from Yoshino District) were merged into Gojō.

Geography
Located in western Nara Prefecture, the Yoshino River flows through the city. It is surrounded mostly by mountains, although the city hall is located in a flat basin. Situated north of the city hall is Mount Kongō, at 1125 m. Persimmon is a major fruit crop in Gojō.

Neighboring municipalities
 Nara Prefecture
 Gose
 Ōyodo
 Shimoichi
 Tenkawa
 Kurotaki
 Nosegawa
 Totsukawa
 Kamikitayama
 Osaka Prefecture
 Kawachinagano
 Chihayaakasaka
 Wakayama Prefecture
 Hashimoto
 Kōya

Climate
Gojō has a humid subtropical climate (Köppen climate classification Cfa) with hot summers and cool to cold winters. Precipitation is significantly higher in summer than in winter, though on the whole lower than most parts of Honshū, and there is no significant snowfall.

Demographics
Per Japanese census data, the population of Gojō in 2020 is 27,927 people. Gojō has been conducting censuses since 1950.

Education
 Primary Schools
 Gojō Elementary School
 Sakaaibe Elementary School
 Nishiyoshino Elementary School
 Makino Elementary School
 Nohara Elementary School
 Ootō Elementary School
 Uchi Elementary School
 Kitauchi Elementary School
 Ada Elementary School
 Junior High Schools
 Gojō Junior High School
 Gojōnishi Junior High School
 Gojōhigashi Junior High School
 Nishiyoshino Junior High School
 Ootō Junior High School
 Nohara Junior High School
 High Schools
 Gojō High School
 Chiben Gakuen High School

Transportation

Rail
West Japan Railways
Wakayama Line: Kitauchi Station - Gojō Station - Yamato-Futami Station

Roads
Expressways
Keinawa Expressway
Japan National Route 24
Japan National Route 168
Japan National Route 309
Japan National Route 310
Japan National Route 370

References

External links 
 Gojō City official website 
 

Cities in Nara Prefecture